Vendelín Opatrný (10 March 1908 – 31 October 1944) was an officer of the Czechoslovak 1st Army Corps. He died during the Battle of the Dukla Pass, at the borders of Czechoslovakia while fighting with the Red Army.

Before entering the Czechoslovak 1st Army Corps in 1937, he fought in the Spanish Civil War as a foreign volunteer. He was 6 times decorated for bravery.

Just before the Second World War he left his country to Soviet Union. Later he enlisted in the Czechoslovak 1st Army Corps.

Decorations 
 in memoriam promoted to captain
 in memoriam Hero of the Czechoslovak Socialist Republic (1969)
 for bravery at fight 4× decorated by Czechoslovak War Cross 1939–1945
 Order of the Red Star
 Order of the Patriotic War
...and several other decorations
 bust of Vendelín Opatrný in Heroes Alley at Dukla Pass by sculptor Ján Kulich (created in 1930)

External links
 Vendelín Opatrný at the official website of Týniště nad Orlicí

1908 births
1944 deaths
People from Rychnov nad Kněžnou District
Czechoslovak expatriates in the Soviet Union
Czechoslovak military personnel killed in World War II
Heroes of the Czechoslovak Socialist Republic
Czechoslovak people of the Spanish Civil War
People granted political asylum in the Soviet Union
Recipients of the Order of the White Lion
Recipients of the Czechoslovak War Cross